All Together was a series of two professional wrestling events organized together by Japan's three biggest promotions; All Japan Pro Wrestling (AJPW), New Japan Pro-Wrestling (NJPW) and Pro Wrestling Noah, in response to the March 2011 Tōhoku earthquake and tsunami. The first event was held in Tokyo on August 27, 2011, and the second in Sendai on February 19, 2012. All proceeds from the events were donated to Japanese Red Cross. The events featured no storylines or championship matches, instead they were booked as "supercards", putting together combinations of wrestlers from the three promotions that fans would normally not see.

Tokyo

On April 18, 2011, Yukinobu Ebata, president of the Tokyo Sports magazine, All Japan Pro Wrestling president Keiji Mutoh and top champion Suwama, New Japan Pro-Wrestling president Naoki Sugabayashi and top champion Hiroshi Tanahashi and Pro Wrestling Noah president Akira Taue and top champion Takashi Sugiura held a press conference in Tokyo's Nippon Budokan, announcing that the three promotions would be coming together for a charity event on August 27 at the same arena. All proceeds from the event would be donated to help those affected by the March 11, 2011, Tōhoku earthquake and tsunami. The event marked the first time all three promotions had come together to co-produce an event and the first time since August 1979, when AJPW and NJPW had co-produced an event. The event was sponsored by Tokyo Sports. Rock band Funkist composed a song named "All Together" for the event, which featured thirty wrestlers from the three promotions singing backing vocals. The event aired live on pay-per-view, and was later aired on tape delay on Fighting TV Samurai, Gaora, NTV G+ and TV Asahi.

In addition to AJPW, NJPW and Noah wrestlers, Kota Ibushi from DDT Pro-Wrestling and Kensuke Sasaki, Katsuhiko Nakajima, Kento Miyahara and Satoshi Kajiwara from Kensuke Office also took part in the event. American retired wrestler Dick Beyer, using his famous The Destroyer character, attended the event and presented a trophy to the winner of the Destroyer Cup. Manabu Nakanishi and Satoshi Kojima from NJPW and Naomichi Marufuji and Takeshi Rikio from Noah were forced to miss the event due to injuries. All in all, the event featured ten matches involving 82 wrestlers. The semi-main event, where AJPW wrestler Keiji Mutoh and Noah wrestler Kenta Kobashi defeated the NJPW tag team of Takashi Iizuka and Toru Yano, was later named the 2011 Match of the Year by Tokyo Sports. On October 25, representatives of the three promotions handed a check of ¥58,273,560 (approx. U.S. $730,000 at the time), made up of ticket, PPV and merchandise sales, to Japanese Red Cross.

Results

  Order of elimination: Hiromu Takahashi, King Fale, Takumi Soya, Black Bushi, Yasufumi Nakanoue, Hideo Saito, Takaaki Watanabe, René Duprée, Akira Taue, Yoshinari Ogawa, Soshun, Lee Jae-kyung, Mazada, Zack Sabre Jr., Satoshi Kajiwara, Tomohiro Ishii, Tomoaki Honma, Kushida, Jun Nishikawa, Joe Doering, Kento Miyahara, Masanobu Fuchi, Super Strong Machine, Masao Inoue, Gedo.

Sendai

The second All Together show, subtitled Mōikkai, Hitotsu ni Narō ze ("Once More, Let's Become One"), was announced at the conclusion of the first show. It was held on February 19, 2012, at the Sendai Sun Plaza Hall in Sendai, Miyagi, which was the nearest major city to the epicenter of the March 11, 2011, earthquake and suffered major damage in it and the following tsunami. Much like the first All Together, the second one also aired live on pay-per-view and on tape delay on Fighting TV Samurai, Gaora, NTV G+ and TV Asahi.

The second All Together event featured outside participation from The Great Sasuke, Jinsei Shinzaki, Kenoh and Taro Nohashi from Michinoku Pro Wrestling and Kensuke Sasaki and Katsuhiko Nakajima from Diamond Ring, the recently renamed Kensuke Office. Female wrestler and owner of the Sendai Girls' Pro Wrestling promotion, Meiko Satomura, greeted fans during the intermission. The event featured eight matches and 50 wrestlers. AJPW's Kenso and NJPW's Kazuchika Okada and Prince Devitt missed the event due to schedule conflicts.

Results

See also
Humanitarian response to the 2011 Tōhoku earthquake and tsunami
World Wrestling Peace Festival

References

2011 Tōhoku earthquake and tsunami relief
2011 in professional wrestling
2012 in professional wrestling
Professional wrestling shows
All Japan Pro Wrestling
New Japan Pro-Wrestling shows
Pro Wrestling Noah shows
Entertainment events in Japan
August 2011 events in Japan
February 2012 events in Japan
Professional wrestling in Tokyo